Lady Catherine Daniel is a Dominican politician from the Dominica Labour Party. She is currently the Member of Parliament for Colihaut.

References 

Living people
21st-century women politicians
Members of the House of Assembly of Dominica
Dominica Labour Party politicians
People from Saint Peter Parish, Dominica
Year of birth missing (living people)
Women government ministers of Dominica
21st-century Dominica women politicians